The Concrete Heritage Museum (formerly Camp Seven Logging Museum) is a local heritage museum in Concrete, Washington. The museum focuses on the industrial history of the region, with collections dedicated to the Superior Portland Cement Company, the Lower Baker Dam, and the region's rich history of logging. The museum maintains an archive of The Concrete Herald, a historical local newspaper established in 1901. The museum has regular summer weekend hours, but is open by appointment only otherwise.

History 

The museum was founded in early 1980s by a retired Concrete judge Herb Larsen. Larsen initially named the museum the Camp Seven Logging Museum, as it was primarily dedicated to the history of logging camps of the area. Later, the museum also incorporated historical collections related to the cement industry of Concrete and regional railroad and hydroelectric power projects. In September 2009, the museum opened an exhibit displaying the contents of the time capsule that was interred on August 11, 1932, by the now defunct Superior Portland Cement Company.

Gallery

Outdoor Exhibit

See also 

 Concrete, Washington
 Camp 6 Logging Museum

References

Literature cited

External links 
 Official website

Museums in Skagit County, Washington
Industry museums in Washington (state)